She's the One is a 2013 Filipino Romantic comedy-drama film directed by Mae Cruz-Alviar and stars Bea Alonzo, Dingdong Dantes and Enrique Gil. It is produced by Star Cinema for its 20th Anniversary presentation.

Plot

Wacky (Dingdong Dantes) and Cat (Bea Alonzo) are childhood best friends. Cat is in love with Wacky, but the two had a fight, which made Cat decide to go home. On the way one of her car tires got flat, and it began to rain. David (Enrique Gil) saw her fixing her car, and took a video of it. David fell in love with her instantly, and he posted the video on the internet entitled "Girl in the Rain". The video became popular. David's best friend, Gillian (Liza Soberano) does not want him to meet the "Girl in the Rain". Wacky helps David look for the girl, not knowing that it is Cat. Elsewhere, Cat's mentally challenged sister watches the video and points out that it is Cat. At first, Wacky couldn't convince Cat to meet with David but eventually, Cat relented.

David and Cat fall in love with each other and Wacky realized that he could have told Cat in the first place that he loved her but it was too late. Wacky tries to impress Cat with the dance they practiced with his friends but then they witness David and Cat kissing. After sometime, the two lovers are seen by Gillian kissing, making her scream in surprise and envy. This surprised Cat and David and the two fell down the stairs, breaking one of their arms. Wacky used this to let Cat know that he loves her. One night Wacky's shirt got wet because of the rain, so he put it inside the dryer and he tried to tell Cat what he felt but David interfered. At David's car, he told Cat that he wants Wacky out of her life because it makes him  uncomfortable, so she confessed her feelings for Wacky. The two lovers had a fight which made them almost break up. In the bar, David called Wacky and told him every bad thing he had to say to him because he was drunk but Gillian stopped him.

Cat and Wacky went to the bar and talked to David, who told Wacky the truth that Cat loves Wacky. They accompanied David home, Gillian confessed her feelings for David to Cat and told Cat that she only sees girls chase David but Cat is the only girl that David ever chased. She told Cat that she's jealous of her and as a friend she felt bad for David. Wacky finally confessed his feelings to Cat and Cat replied that if he had told it before it was too late they could have been together. David finally let go of Cat and realized that the one girl he loves is Gillian and the two became a couple. At Cat's birthday, Wacky and his friends set him up with Cat and then the two finally became a couple.

Cast

Bea Alonzo as Cat Aguinaldo
Dingdong Dantes as Wacky Delos Reyes
Enrique Gil as David Esguerra
Liza Soberano as Gillian
Pinky Amador as Judith
RS Francisco as Tony
Guji Lorenzana as Mike
Coleen Garcia as Mandy
Daniel Matsunaga as Jason
LJ Reyes as Patty
Erika Padilla as Jessie
Marc Solis as Pao
Barbie Sabino as Carrie
Timothy Lambert Chan as Coby
Arlene Tolibas as Perla
Cheska Iñigo as Vicky
Sofia Andres as Claire
Leo Rialp as Ramon
Perla Bautista
Tony Mabesa

Accolades

References

2013 films
Star Cinema films
Philippine romantic comedy-drama films
Films directed by Mae Cruz-Alviar